Razor-qt is a discontinued free and open-source desktop environment. It was intended as a lightweight desktop environment based upon the Qt application framework, and was "tailored for users who value simplicity, speed, and an intuitive interface."

Development of Razor-qt has ceased, as it has merged with LXDE's Qt port to form LXQt.

Overview
Razor-qt was still in the early stages of development. , the environment included a panel viewer and switcher, a desktop, an application launcher, a settings center and sessions. These components could be enabled or disabled by the user.

Razor-qt could be used with any modern X window manager such as Openbox, fvwm2, or KWin.

The memory consumption of Razor-qt was slightly above LXDE, using 114 MiB in a reviewer's test while LXDE used 108 MiB.

Merge with LXDE 

After LXDE developer Hong Jen Yee ported PCManFM to Qt in early 2013, he and other interested developers discussed a potential collaboration with Razor-qt, another open-source desktop environment with similar software design goals. The first release of the new product, LXQt v0.7.0, was made public on 2014-05-07.

See also 

 Comparison of X Window System desktop environments

References

External links 

 

Free desktop environments
Software that uses Qt